The Cheminée du Front-de-Seine is a chimney located in the 15th arrondissement, in the Grenelle district of Paris. It is 130 metres high and the tallest structure in the district by 30 metres.

The chimney was designed by François Stahly and was built between 1970 and 1971. Its simple white form is unadorned except for aesthetic vents located in top of the structure.

Usage 

The chimney ventilates smoke from six boilers used to produce steam from low-sulfur fuel oil, which is distributed through underground pipes to the buildings of the district for central heating and as domestic hot water. It is overseen by the Parisian Company of District Heating (CPCU).

Its output is 590 tons of steam per hour. Ordinarily, only four boilers are used. The last two are only used during cold weather or to substitute for unavailable boilers in the CPCU network.

In 2016, the boiler house underwent renovations in order to function using biodiesel instead of fuel oil. The boiler's efficiency was improved by 5% to 8% and the amount of pollutants released was decreased by a factor of 10.

Aquatic garden 
The chimney is accompanied by an aquatic garden on the roof of the boiler house, which was designed by Catherine Stahly-Mougin, the daughter of the sculptor.

However, seepage of stagnant water from the pools, due to a lack of drainage for rainwater and watertight sealing, led the pools to be emptied in 1995 and, later, to a full renovation of the gardens.

Ornithology 
A birdbox was installed on the chimney in 1994 after a pair of Common kestrels was spotted nesting atop the chimney. The nest was abandoned in the years that followed.

In March 2013, a pair of Peregrine falcons returned in Paris for the first time in decades, in the same birdbox installed nearly 20 years before. The nest is under camera surveillance, and the couple had 3 chicks in the spring of 2013.

Notes

Towers completed in 1971
Chimneys in France